Vandijkophrynus, also known as Van Dijk's toads, are a small genus of true toads, family Bufonidae. They are native to Southern Africa (southern Namibia, South Africa, Lesotho, and Eswatini, Zimbabwe, and Mozamibique). The name commemorates Eddie Van Dijk, a South African herpetologist.

Originally, all Vandijkophrynus species were included in the genus Bufo as the former "Bufo angusticeps" group.

Species
The species in this genus are:
 Vandijkophrynus amatolicus (Hewitt, 1925)
 Vandijkophrynus angusticeps (Smith, 1848)
 Vandijkophrynus gariepensis (Smith, 1848)
 Vandijkophrynus inyangae (Poynton, 1963)
 Vandijkophrynus nubicola (Hewitt, 1927)
 Vandijkophrynus robinsoni (Branch and Braack, 1996)

References

 
Amphibian genera
Frogs of Africa
Vertebrates of Southern Africa
Taxa named by Andrew Smith (zoologist)